Menneus is a genus of net-casting spiders that was first described by Eugène Simon in 1876. It includes the former genera Avella and Avellopsis. Species are found in Australia, New Caledonia, and eastern and southern Africa. Originally placed with the cribellate orb-weavers, it was moved to the Deinopidae in 1967.

Species
 it contains fourteen species:
Menneus aussie Coddington, Kuntner & Opell, 2012 – Australia (Queensland, New South Wales), New Caledonia
Menneus bituberculatus Coddington, Kuntner & Opell, 2012 – Australia (Queensland), possibly New Guinea
Menneus camelus Pocock, 1902 – South Africa
Menneus capensis (Purcell, 1904) – South Africa
Menneus darwini Coddington, Kuntner & Opell, 2012 – Tanzania
Menneus dromedarius Purcell, 1904 – South Africa, Madagascar
Menneus nemesio Coddington, Kuntner & Opell, 2012 – Australia (New South Wales)
Menneus neocaledonicus (Simon, 1888) – New Caledonia
Menneus quasimodo Coddington, Kuntner & Opell, 2012 – Australia (Western Australia)
Menneus samperi Coddington, Kuntner & Opell, 2012 – East Africa
Menneus superciliosus (Thorell, 1881) – Australia (Queensland, New South Wales)
Menneus tetragnathoides Simon, 1876 (type) – Angola, Malawi, Tanzania
Menneus trinodosus Rainbow, 1920 – Australia (Queensland, New South Wales, Lord Howe Is.)
Menneus wa Coddington, Kuntner & Opell, 2012 – Australia (Western Australia)

References

Araneomorphae genera
Deinopidae
Taxa named by Eugène Simon